Adavathur West  is a village in Srirangam taluk of Tiruchirappalli district in Tamil Nadu, India.

Demographics 

As per the 2001 census, Adavathur West had a population of 8,748 with 4,261 males and 4,487 females. The sex ratio was 1053 and the literacy rate, 72.7.

References 

 

Villages in Tiruchirappalli district